The Bet is a 1992 American short film directed by Ted Demme, written by Gavin O'Connor, and starring Josh Mosby and John B. Hickey. The soundtrack was composed by John Terelle of the Hawaiian Pups and Michael Wolff with Lou Marini.

Plot
Two brothers Harry and Henry Hicks, run a New York deli they've inherited from their father. Younger brother Harry then develops a gambling problem.

Cast
Josh Mosby as Harry
John B. Hickey as Henry
Vinny Pastore as Nino
David Little as Lenny
Anthony Crivello as Carbo
Pete Castelli as Man Placing Bet

References

External links

1992 drama films
1992 short films
1992 films
American drama short films
Films directed by Ted Demme
Films about gambling
1990s English-language films
1990s American films